The Elevador do Lavra, also known as the Ascensor do Lavra or Lavra Funicular, is a funicular railway in Lisbon, Portugal.  Opened in 1884, the railway is the oldest funicular in the city.  The 188m-long funicular connects Largo da Anunciada to  Rua Câmara Pestana in the parishes of Santo António and Arroios.  The average grade is 22.9% and the railway gauge is 90cm with a central slot for the cable's connection.

The Elevador do Lavra opened on April 19, 1884, and was designed by engineer Raoul Mesnier du Ponsard.  Currently, the funicular is owned and operated by Carris.  Elevador do Lavra was designated a National Monument in 2002.

References

Ascensor Gloria
Transport in Lisbon